The Moratuwa Municipal Council is the local council for Moratuwa, a large coastal city in Colombo District.

History 

In January 1908, the first local government body was established in Moratuwa. It was chaired by the Government Agent, and consisted of 6 representatives: 3 members of the public and 3 Government officials.

In 1930, the Moratuwa Urban Council was established. The gazette was issued in January 1928, elections held in 1929, and the council first met in January 1930. There were 8 wards electing a single representative each, and additionally there were 4 appointed members. In 1942 the number of wards and elected members was increased to 10, and the number of appointed members was reduced to 2.

As per Gazette Notification No. 957/13 dated 8 January 1997, the Moratuwa Municipal Council was established. The change came into effect in April of the same year.

Demographics

Ethnic groups

Religions

Services

Libraries 

The Municipal Council runs 8 public libraries:

 Janasetha Library, Katubedda
 Moratuwa Public Library
 Soysapura Branch Library
 Galpotta Branch Library
 Thelawala Branch Library
 Egoda Uyana Branch Library
 Katukurunda Branch Library
 Koralawella Branch Library

References 

Moratuwa
Local authorities in Western Province, Sri Lanka
Municipal councils of Sri Lanka
1997 establishments in Sri Lanka